Jayde Van Dyk (born 28 March 1996) is an Australian rules footballer playing for St Kilda in the AFL Women's (AFLW). A defender who played with Hawthorn in the VFL Women's (VFLW), she was drafted by Carlton with the twenty-first selection in the 2018 AFLW draft. Van Dyk debuted in the opening round of the 2019 season and played in the 2019 AFL Women's Grand Final.

Early career 
Van Dyk played for her local club in Chirnside Park, Victoria. She trained with Carlton as injury cover during their inaugural AFLW season in 2017, which she cited as the point when she first sought to play professional football. Van Dyk joined Hawthorn's VFLW team, where she wore number 36, and played in their 2018 premiership. She won the 2018 Debbie Lee Medal as the best young player in the VFLW, Hawthorn's best and fairest, and was named in the VFLW Team of the Year in defence. Ahead of the 2018 AFLW draft, Van Dyk was predicted to be the first mature-age player selected.

AFLW career 
Van Dyk was drafted by Carlton with the twenty-first pick in the 2018 AFLW draft, their third selection. Van Dyk appreciated leadership shown by her experienced teammates, citing Brianna Davey, Kerryn Harrington, Tayla Harris, Gabriella Pound, and Darcy Vescio as examples. She played nine games in her first season, including the preliminary final and grand final. It was revealed Van Dyk had signed on with the Saints for two more years on 30 June 2021, tying her to the club until the end of the 2022/2023 season.

References

External links 

Living people
1996 births
Australian rules footballers from Melbourne
Carlton Football Club (AFLW) players
Eastern Ranges players (NAB League Girls)
St Kilda Football Club (AFLW) players
People from Yarra Ranges